The YJ-12 is a Chinese supersonic anti-ship cruise missile.

Description
The YJ-12 is an air-launched missile that resembles a lengthened Kh-31.

A 2011 article in the United States Naval War College Review credited the "YJ-91/YJ-12" with a range of 400 km and a 205 kg high explosive warhead, compared to the  range of a Harpoon anti-ship missile. Furthermore, an aircraft could launch the "YJ-91/YJ-12" while still 230 km beyond the range of SM-2 and Sparrow anti-air missiles, which have ranges of less than 170 km. In a September 2014 article published in Joint Forces Quarterly, the missile was credited with a range of up to 250 km and a speed of Mach 2.5. In February 2015, military expert Li Li claimed the YJ-12 has a  warhead and a range of  when traveling at Mach 3, or 400 km at a speed of Mach 4. The YJ-12 can also do evasive maneuvers to avoid anti-missile threats.

A saturation attack by YJ-12's fired at long range would pose a grave threat to American carrier strike groups; once the wave of sea-skimming missiles appeared over the horizon and was detected by ships' own sensors, they would only have some 45 seconds to engage before impact and if there were enough, short range defenses would be overwhelmed. The U.S. Navy's counter is to use the Cooperative Engagement Capability to detect and destroy the YJ-12's launch aircraft with SM-6 missiles and fighters at long range before they can be fired.

It has been test-launched from Xian H-6 bombers. Reportedly, they may also be launched from the J-10, Su-30MKK, the J-11 and J-16, For warships, it equips the PLAN's refitted Sovremenny-class destroyer.

Development
In August 2000, the Chinese unveiled a model of an air-launched missile labelled as the YJ-91, resembling the French Air-Sol Moyenne Portée. Later, a similar looking missile was seen that may have been designated as the YJ-12. Jane's reported that a YJ-12A was supposedly in development in 2004. The YJ-91 designation ultimately went to the Chinese development of the Russian Kh-31. The YJ-12 ultimately resembled a lengthened Kh-31.

The YJ-12 appeared at the 2015 China Victory Day Parade, indicating that the missile had entered active service since all weapons showcased during the parade are actively inducted prior to the parade.

The YJ-12B was reportedly deployed to the Spratly Islands around April 2018. They may cover the southern half of the South China Sea when based on three largest Chinese-controlled islands.

Variants
YJ-12
Air-launched variant

YJ-12B
Land-based variant with  range.

CM-302
In November 2016, CASIC unveiled the CM-302 as the export version of the YJ-12. It is marketed as "the world's best anti-ship missile"  that it is supersonic throughout its flight, can be launched from air, land, and naval platforms, can disable a 5,000-tonne warship, and be used in a land attack role.

Operators

Current operators

People's Liberation Army Navy

Pakistan Air Force, CM-400
Pakistan Navy, CM-302
Type 054A/P frigate

Algerian National Navy, CM-302

See also
Related development
YJ-18
HD-1

Comparable missiles
3M-54 Klub
BrahMos
P-800 Oniks
Perseus (missile)
ASM-3
Yun Feng

References

Bibliography

Guided missiles of the People's Republic of China
Anti-ship cruise missiles of the People's Republic of China
Air-to-surface missiles
Weapons of the People's Republic of China
Military equipment introduced in the 2010s